The 1953–54 Egyptian Premier League, was the 5th season of the Egyptian Premier League, the top Egyptian professional league for association football clubs, since its establishment in 1948. The season started on 27 September 1953 and concluded on 23 May 1954.
El Qanah entered as the promoted team from the Egyptian Second Division. They replaced Port Fuad, who was relegated.

Defending champions Al Ahly won their 5th consecutive and 5th overall Egyptian Premier League title in the club history.

League table 

 (C)= Champions, (R)= Relegated, Pld = Matches played; W = Matches won; D = Matches drawn; L = Matches lost; F = Goals for; A = Goals against; ± = Goal difference; Pts = Points.

References

External links 
 All Egyptian Competitions Info
 season info

5
1953–54 in African association football leagues
1953–54 in Egyptian football